Switching Channels is a 1988 American comedy film remake of the 1928 play The Front Page, the 1931 film of the same name, and the 1940 film His Girl Friday. It stars Kathleen Turner as Christy Colleran, Burt Reynolds as John L. Sullivan IV, Christopher Reeve as Blaine Bingham, Ned Beatty as Roy Ridnitz, Henry Gibson as Ike Roscoe, and George Newbern as Sigenthaler. The film was notorious for its harsh infighting between Reynolds and Turner during filming. The film was a box office failure and received mixed reviews from critics.

It is available on DVD in Regions 2 and 4. It is also available as a burn-on-demand DVD-R in Region 1.

Synopsis
John L. "Sully" Sullivan, IV is the news director of Satellite News Network (SNN), a Chicago-based TV cable news station. Christy Colleran, his best reporter and ex-wife, goes on vacation, where she falls in love with Blaine Bingham, the owner of a sporting goods company. Christy returns to Chicago with Blaine and meets with Sully, who orders her to attend the execution of convicted murderer Ike Roscoe. Christy announces she is quitting the TV station and marrying Blaine the day after tomorrow in New York City. Not wanting to let Christy leave him, Sully orders his junior reporter Siegenthaler to buy up all available transportation tickets out of town. 

During lunch with Christy and Blaine, Sully explains that Roscoe is in prison for killing his son's drug dealer, not realizing that the dealer was an undercover cop. The execution has become a political issue, related to the Democratic primary contest between the Governor and Roy Ridnitz, the State's District Attorney. 

Blaine manages to purchase some train tickets to New York. Sully, who has discovered Blaine is afraid of heights, tells Siegenthaler to lure Blaine to a skyscraper. After getting on the glass elevator with Siegenthaler, Blaine has a crippling anxiety attack as the elevator rises and presses on the emergency stop button, trapping both of them there. After the interview with Roscoe, Christy rushes to the building and saves the two men.

The Governor is inundated with calls from citizens asking him to pardon Ike Roscoe. He decides to issue a pardon during the 11:00 pm news. Ridnitz orders the execution moved up to 10:00 pm and invites the media to televise it live. As Ike is strapped into the chair, a power surge occurs and he escapes.

Christy sees Ike escaping while riding in limousine with Blaine on her way out of town. She gets out and tells Blaine she will meet him at the train station. After catching up to Ike, Christy tells him to go to the second floor courthouse press room. Christy telephones Sully from the press room and tells him she found Ike. After she hangs up, Ike hides inside the press room photo copier as other reporters arrive. Ridnitz appears with armed police and announces that Ike was seen on the third floor. After a series of comic escapades, Christy stalls Ridnitz long enough for Ike's pardon to come through. Christy turns on a news camera and tricks Ridnitz into confessing that he wanted Ike executed in order to win the election. Sully hands the tape over to Siegenthaler and tells him to run the story.

Blaine graciously steps out of Christy's life, saying that her true loves are the news and Sully. Sully and Christy go to Hawaii for their second honeymoon.

Cast
 Kathleen Turner as Christy Colleran
 Burt Reynolds as John L. "Sully" Sullivan IV
 Christopher Reeve as Blaine Bingham
 Ned Beatty as Roy Ridnitz
 Henry Gibson as Ike Roscoe
 George Newbern as Siegenthaler
 Arlene Mazerolle as Hotel Recepitionist

Filmed primarily in Canada with a Canadian director (Ted Kotcheff), Switching Channels features many popular Canadian character actors in supporting roles: Al Waxman as Berger, the station manager, Ken James as Warden Terwilliger, Barry Flatman and Anthony Sherwood as television reporters Zaks and Carvalho, Joe Silver as newswriter Mordsini, Tony Rosato, Jackie Richardson, Philip Akin, Laura Robinson, Fiona Reid and Jack Duffy. It also co-stars Charles Kimbrough as the hapless Governor.

Production
The male lead was meant to be played by Michael Caine but he was delayed filming Jaws: The Revenge. Burt Reynolds was cast instead. Reynolds recalled:
I wasn't doing anything other than sitting around mulling over the lint in my belly button... I've always been a great fan of Ted Kotcheff - I really liked North Dallas Forty - and I loved the period of films, the thirties and the forties, The Front Page comes out of. I hope Cary Grant, whom I knew and admired, won't be whirling in his grave over what we've done. But we're keeping it fast and talky: some scenes are eight pages of dialogue.

Turner-Reynolds Feuding
Kathleen Turner and Burt Reynolds had a very strained working relationship on set, and both have commented negatively on one another in years since.

In 2018, Kathleen Turner said the following of her experience working with Burt Reynolds on Switching Channels: 

In March 2018, when he was asked by Andy Cohen who the most overrated actor of the 1970s and 1980s was, Reynolds cited Turner.

Reception

Critical response
Siskel & Ebert gave Switching Channels mixed results: Ebert was positive about the film and liked how the film did overall; however, Siskel expressed strong disappointment in the film and gave Switching Channels a thumbs down. Rotten Tomatoes currently lists Switching Channels with a 57% rating based on 14 reviews.

Reeve, who played against type as the hapless fiancé, later expressed regret in making the film, believing he "made a fool of himself" and that he had only taken the project as a distraction from depression following a divorce. He also reportedly had to act as "referee", as costars Turner and Reynolds feuded with each other during filming. According to his autobiography Still Me, one of the main reasons he took the role was because Michael Caine was originally lined up to play Sullivan, and he had enjoyed working with Caine six years earlier in Deathtrap, but after signing on found out that Caine had been booted out in favor of Reynolds. Another scene Reeve was in disfavor of was his character suffering acrophobia by showing fear when in a scenic glass elevator, a likely spoof of Reeve's best known role as Superman.

The film was nominated for two Golden Raspberry Awards: Burt Reynolds was nominated for Worst Actor and Christopher Reeve for Worst Supporting Actor. However, they respectively "lost" to Sylvester Stallone for Rambo III and Dan Aykroyd for Caddyshack II.

References

External links
 
 
 
 

1988 films
1988 comedy films
Remakes of American films
American comedy films
Comedy of remarriage films
Films scored by Michel Legrand
Films about journalists
Films about television
American films based on plays
Films directed by Ted Kotcheff
Films set in Chicago
Films shot in Chicago
Films shot in Miami
Films shot in Montreal
Films shot in Toronto
TriStar Pictures films
1980s English-language films
1980s American films